Jean Chaufourier, a French landscape painter and engraver, was born in Paris in 1675. He married a daughter of the celebrated engraver, Gerard Edelinck, and taught drawing to Mariette. He was received into the Academy in 1735, and died at St. Germain-en-Laye in 1757. There are three of his drawings in the Louvre, and we have a set of eight landscapes engraved by him.

References
 

1675 births
1757 deaths
17th-century French painters
French male painters
18th-century French painters
17th-century French engravers
18th-century French engravers
French landscape painters
Painters from Paris
18th-century French male artists